Laurindo Almeida Quartet Featuring Bud Shank (later released as Brazilliance)  is an album by guitarist Laurindo Almeida with saxophonist Bud Shank that was recorded in 1953 and 1954 for the Pacific Jazz label.

Reception

Allmusic gave the album three stars.

Track listing

Personnel 
 Laurindo Almeida – guitar
 Bud Shank – alto saxophone
 Harry Babasin – double bass
 Roy Harte – drums

References 

1955 albums
Pacific Jazz Records albums
Bud Shank albums
Laurindo Almeida albums

fr:Laurindo Almeida Quartet featuring Bud Shank